In mass spectrometry, a matrix is a compound that promotes the formation of ions. Matrix compounds are used in matrix-assisted laser desorption/ionization (MALDI), matrix-assisted ionization (MAI), and fast atom bombardment (FAB).

Matrix-assisted laser desorption/ionization
MALDI is an ionization technique where laser energy is absorbed by a matrix to create ions from large molecules without fragmentation. The matrix, typically in excess, is mixed with the analyze molecule and deposited on a target.  A table of matrix compounds, their structures, laser wavelengths typically used, and typical application is shown below.

Matrix-assisted ionization
Matrix-assisted ionization is an ionization method in mass spectrometry that creates ions via the creation of particles at atmospheric pressure and transfer to the vacuum of the mass analyzer.

Fast atom bombardment
FAB uses a high energy beam of atoms directed at a surface to create ions. FAB matrix compounds are typically liquids.

See also
Desorption/ionization on silicon

References

Mass spectrometry